Candida oleophila is a species of yeast in the genus Candida.

References

External links

Yeasts
oleophila
Fungi described in 1967